Panorama Developments (Guildford) Ltd v Fidelis Furnishing Fabrics Ltd [1971] 2 QB 711 is a UK company law case, concerning the enforceability of obligations against a company.

Facts
Fidelis’ company secretary, Mr Bayne, hired cars from Panorama Development's business, Belgravia Executive Car Rental. Bayne used the Fidelis' paper and represented that he wished to hire a number of Rolls-Royce's and Jaguars for the business while his managing director was away. He was lying and he used them himself. Bayne was prosecuted and imprisoned, but Belgravia had outstanding £570 12s 6d for the hired cars. Fidelis claimed that it was not bound to the hire contracts, because Bayne never had the authority to enter them.

Judgment
Lord Denning MR held that Fidelis was nevertheless bound on the contract to Panorama. Mr Bayne, as company secretary had implied actual authority by virtue of his position as Company Secretary to enter into such agreements. Times had changed since 1887 when Barnett v South London Tramways Co held that company secretaries could not be assumed to have authority for anything. Secretaries are ‘certainly entitled to sign contracts connected with the administrative side of a company’s affairs, such as employing staff and ordering cars, and so forth.’ His judgment went as follows.

Salmon LJ said the secretary ‘is the chief administrative officer of the company’ so he has ostensible authority with administrative matters. Nothing is more natural than ‘ordering cars so that its servants may go and meet foreign customers at airports, nothing to my mind, is more natural than that the company should hire those cars through its secretary.’ It might not be so with matters of commercial management of the company, for example, a contract for the sale or purchase of goods in which the company deals’ but that was not the case here.

Megaw LJ concurred.

See also

Agency in English law
Capacity in English law
UK company law

References

United Kingdom company case law
Court of Appeal (England and Wales) cases
Lord Denning cases
1971 in case law
1971 in British law